McNair is an unincorporated community in Lake County, Minnesota, United States. The community is located 20 miles north of the city of Two Harbors at the intersection of Lake County Highway 2 and Langley River Road, Forest Road 122.

Lake County Road 203, Kane Lake Road, is nearby. McNair is located within the Superior National Forest; and also located within Lake No. 2 Unorganized Territory of Lake County.

Arts and culture
The annual McNair Butterfly Count near McNair is held in early July. The event is organized for the purpose of identifying and counting butterflies in a specific area. The research data gathered during a count can indicate population changes and health within a species. The management of the nearby McNair Butterfly Area has been a cooperative project between the Minnesota DNR and the USDA Forest Service with initial support from the Nature Conservancy.

References

Unincorporated communities in Minnesota
Unincorporated communities in Lake County, Minnesota